Val Caniparoli is an American ballet dancer and international choreographer. His work includes more than 100 productions for ballet, opera, and theater for over 50 companies, and his career as a choreographer progressed globally even as he continued his professional dance career with the San Francisco Ballet.

He joined the San Francisco Ballet as a dancer in 1973. He was appointed to the position of principal character dancer with the San Francisco Ballet by Artistic Director Helgi Tomasson in 1987.

Early years 

Caniparoli was born in Renton, Washington, to Francisco Caniparoli, a clothing manufacturer, and Leonora (Marconi) Caniparoli, who worked at Boeing. He attended Washington State University (WSU), where he studied music and theater. When the First Chamber Dance Company was touring Eastern Washington, they did performances at WSU, and offered workshops in ballet. Caniparoli attended one and was told he had talent, and should audition at the San Francisco Ballet School. Thereafter he decided to pursue a career in ballet, and left WSU. He received a scholarship from the Ford Foundation that enabled him to attend the San Francisco Ballet School. Caniparoli performed with San Francisco Opera Ballet, and in 1973, just a year and a half into his studies, he was offered a contract with San Francisco Ballet. In his debut season, he worked under Co-Artistic Directors Lew Christensen and Michael Smuin, and later, under Helgi Tomasson.

Caniparoli became interested in choreography when he attended a choreography workshop offered by the Pacific Northwest Ballet. After that work, his choreography career expanded and he was appointed resident choreographer for the San Francisco Ballet in the mid-1980s. In 1984, Caniparoli co-founded a choreographic collective called OMO in San Francisco, and a documentary about OMO's founding was broadcast that year on PBS. In 1994, he created his first full-length ballet entitled Lady of the Camellias, based on a story by Alexandre Dumas, and with a score by Frédéric Chopin. Lady of the Camellias became one of Caniparoli's most popular works, and a part of the repertoire of several ballet companies, including Ballet West, Ballet Florida, Boston Ballet, Cincinnati Ballet, Tulsa Ballet, and Royal Winnipeg Ballet.

Caniparoli was Resident Choreographer for Ballet West from 1993 to 1997, and for Tulsa Ballet from 2001 to 2006. He continues to create works for San Francisco Ballet.

In 1995, Caniparoli choreographed a new work entitled Lambarena, set to a musical blend of J.S. Bach with Traditional African music composed by Pierre Akendengue and Hughes de Courson. Lambarena has become another of Caniparoli's most popular creations, a blend of classical ballet and African dance. This ballet has been performed more than 20 companies, including Atlanta Ballet, Boston Ballet, Cincinnati Ballet, Singapore Dance Theatre, San Francisco Ballet, and State Ballet of South Africa.

In 2002, Caniparoli was invited to choreograph a pas de deux to be performed by Evelyn Hart and Rex Harrington for Queen Elizabeth II to celebrate her Golden Jubilee visit to Canada.

In May 2010, San Francisco's American Conservatory Theater (A.C.T.) premiered Tosca Cafe, a theater/dance work co-created and co-directed by Caniparoli and A.C.T.'s Carey Perloff; Caniparoli also did the choreography. "'Tosca Cafe"', which started as The Tosca Project, chronicles a wide cast of characters who inhabit Tosca, a bar in the North Beach section of San Francisco in the same location for decades. Caniparoli and Perloff saw this work as a unique opportunity for collaboration between dancers and actors. Since its 2010 premiere in San Francisco, Tosca Cafe has been performed internationally.

Influences 

While growing up in Renton, Washington, Caniparoli studied music for 13 years. His study included private lessons on alto saxophone, clarinet, and flute. He credits his study of music with nurturing his eclectic interest in world music and composers, and varied genres. He has become well known for his use of widely diverse music as a principal foundation for his choreographic work. He was also influenced by the dancing of film stars Gene Kelly and Fred Astaire. Caniparoli's work has been described as "rooted in classicism but influenced by all forms of movement: modern dance, ethnic dance, social dancing, even ice skating."

Personal 

Caniparoli lives in San Francisco, California.

Ballet choreography 

Jekyll & Hyde, 2020 (Composers: Krzysztof Penderecki, Frédéric Chopin, Henryk Górecki, Wojciech Kilar, Henryk Wieniawski) Finnish National Ballet
Foreshadow, 2018 (Composer: Ludovico Einaudi) San Francisco Ballet
The Nutcracker, 2018 (Composer: Peter Ilych Tchaikovsky) Royal New Zealand Ballet
If I Were A Sushi Roll, 2018 (Composer: Nico Muhly) Smuin Ballet
Dances for Lou, 2017 (Composer: Lou Harrison) Ballet West
4 in the Morning, 2016 (Composer: William Walton) Amy Seiwert's Imagery
Twisted 2, 2016 (Composer: André Previn, Jacques Offenbach, Arnold Schoenberg) BalletMet
Repeat After Me, 2016 (Composer: Johann Paul Von Westhoff) Menlo Ballet
Without Borders, 2016 (Composer: Yo-Yo Ma and the Silk Road Ensemble) Texas Ballet Theater
Beautiful Dreamer, 2016 (Composer: Stephen Collins Foster) Oakland Ballet
Stolen Moments, 2015 (Composer: Jean-Phillippe Rameau) Richmond Ballet
Das Ballett, 2015 (Composer: Leopold Mozart) Oakland Ballet
The Nutcracker 2014 (Composer: Peter Ilych Tchaikovsky) Grand Rapids Ballet
Twisted, 2014 (Composer: Benjamin Britten, Gioachino Rossini, Giacomo Puccini) BalletMet
Tutto Eccetto Il Lavandino (Everything But The Kitchen Sink) 2014 (Composer: Antonio Vivaldi) Smuin Ballet
Spaghetti Western 2014 (Composer: Ennio Morricone) Louisville Ballet
Tears, 2014 (Composer: Steve Reich) San Francisco Ballet
In Pieces, 2013 (Composer: Poul Ruders) Colorado Ballet
 Triptych, 2013 (Composer: John Tavener & Alexander Balanescu), Amy Siewert's Imagery 
 Caprice, 2013 Premiere: Cincinnati Ballet
 The Lottery, 2012 (Composer: Robert Moran) Premiere: Ballet West 
 Chant, 2012 (Composer: Lou Harrison) Premiere: Singapore Dance Theatre 
 Incantations, 2012 (Composer: Alexandre Rabinovitch-Barakovsky) Premiere: Joffrey Ballet 
 Swipe, 2012 (Composer: Gabriel Prokofiev) Premiere: Richmond Ballet 
 Tears From Above, 2011 (Composer: Elena Kats-Chermin) Premiere: Diablo Ballet 
 Double Stop, 2011 (Composer: Philip Glass) San francisco Ballet 
 Blades of Grass, 2010 (Composer: Tan Dun) Premiere: Milwaukee Ballet 
 Still Life, 2010 (Composer: Elena Kats-Chermin) Premiere: Scottish Ballet 
 Amor Con Fortuna, 2009 (Composer: Jordi Savali, Various) Premiere: Tulsa Ballet 
 The Seasons, 2009 (Composer: Alexander Glazunov) Premiere: Pacific Northwest Ballet
 The Nutcracker, 2009 (Composer: Pyotr Ilyich Tchaikovsky) Premiere: Louisville Ballet
 Ebony Concerto, 2009 (Composer: Igor Stravinsky) Premiere: San Francisco Ballet
Ibsen's House, 2008 (Composer: Antonín Dvořák) Premiere: San Francisco Ballet 
 Suite, 2007 (Composer: George Frederic Handel) Premiere: American Repertory Ballet
 Violin, 2006 (Composer: Heinrich Ignaz Franz Biber) Premiere: Richmond Ballet
 Songs, 2005 (Composer: Chick Corea) Premiere: Central West Ballet
 Ikon of Eros, 2005 (Composer: John Tavenor) Premiere: Washington Ballet
 Sonata for Two Pianos and Percussion, 2004 (Composer: Béla Bartók) Premiere: Boston Ballet 
 Val Caniparoli's A Cinderella Story, 2004 (Composer: Richard Rodgers) Premiere: Royal Winnipeg Ballet  
 Gustav's Rooster, 2003 (Composer: Hoven Droven) Premiere: Tulsa Ballet 
 Vivace, 2003 (Composer: Franz Schubert) Premiere: Tulsa Ballet
 Untitled, 2003 (Composer:: Dmitri Shostakovich) Premiere: Royal Winnipeg Ballet
 No Other, 2002 (Composer: Richard Rodgers) Premiere: San Francisco Ballet
 Unspoken, 2002 (Composer: Camille Saint-Saëns) Premiere: Royal Winnipeg Ballet
 Misa Criolla, 2002 (Composer: Ariel Ramirez) Premiere: Tulsa Ballet
 Devil's Sonata, 2002 (Composer: Guiseppi Tartini) Premiere: Sacramento Ballet
 boink! 2002 (Composer: Juan Garcia Esquivel) Premiere: Lawrence Pech Dance Company
 The Nutcracker, 2001 (Composer: Pyotr Ilyich Tchaikovsky) Premiere: Cincinnati Ballet
 Torque, 2001 (Composer: Michael Torke) Premiere: Pacific Northwest Ballet 
 Jaybird Lounge, 2001 (Composer Uri Caine) Premiere: Pennsylvania Ballet
 Death of a Moth, 2001 (Composer: Carlos Surinach) Premiere: San Francisco Ballet 
 Bird's Nest, 2000 (Composer: Charlie Parker) Premiere: Washington Ballet
 Already Dusk, 2000 (Composer: Johannes Brahms) Premiere: Lawrence Pech Dance Company
 Fade to Black, 2000 (Composer: Nina Simone) Premiere: L. Feijoo and Y. Possokhov
 Going for Baroque 1999 (Composer: Antonio Vivaldi) Premiere: Tulsa Ballet
 Attention Please, 1999 (Composer: J.S. Bach) Premiere: Richmond Ballet
 Aquilarco, 1999 (Composer: Giovanni Sollima) Premiere: San Francisco Ballet 
 Separations, 1999 (Composer: Dmitri Shostakovich) Premiere: Ballet Florida
 Open Veins, 1998 (Composer: Robert Moran) Premiere: Atlanta Ballet 
 Aria, 1998 (Composer: George Frederic Handel) Premiere: San Francisco Ballet
 Book of Alleged Dances, 1998 (Composer: John Adams) Premiere: Ballet West
 Slow, 1998 (Composer: Graham Fitkin) Premiere: San Francisco Ballet
 The Bridge, 1998 (Composer: Dmitri Shostakovich) Premiere: Pacific Northwest Ballet
 Djangology, 1997 (Composer: Django Reinhardt) Premiere: Richmond Ballet 
 Ciao, Marcello, 1997 (Composer: Nino Rota) Premiere: San Francisco Ballet
 Prawn-watching, 1996 (Composer: Michael Nyman) Premiere: Ballet West 
 Bow Out, 1995 (Composers: David Bedford and Roy Powell) Premiere: Richmond Ballet
 Lambarena, 1995 (Composer: J.S. Bach and Traditional African) Premiere: San Francisco Ballet 
 La Folia, 1994 (Composer: Gregorio Paniagua) Premiere: Marin Ballet
 Tangazzo, 1994 (Composer: Amadeo Roldan) Premiere: Marin Ballet
 Lady of the Camellias, 1994 (Composer: Frédéric Chopin) Premiere: Ballet West 
 Seeing Stars, 1993 (Composer: Erno Dohnanyi) Premiere: San Francisco Ballet
 Concerto Grosso, 1992 (Composer: Arcangelo Corelli) Premiere: Marin Ballet
 Pulcinella, 1991 (Composer: Igor Stravinsky) Premiere: San Francisco Ballet
 Tryst, 1991 (Composer: Wolfgang Amadeus Mozart) Premiere: Pacific Northwest Ballet
 Gran Partita, 1990 (Composer: Wolfgang Amadeus Mozart) Premiere: Pacific Northwest Ballet 
 In Perpetuum, 1990 (Composer: Arvo Pärt) Premiere: San Francisco Ballet
 Ritual, 1990 (Composer: Alfred Schnittke) Premiere: Johann Renvall and Stars of American Ballet
 A Door Is Ajar, 1990 (Composer: Kronos Quartet) Premiere: Ririe Woodbury
 Between Ourselves, 1989 (Composer: Béla Bartók) Premiere: Pittsburgh Ballet Theatre
 Kinetic Impressions, 1989 (Composer: Francis Poulenc) Premiere: Ballet West
 Connotations, 1989 (Composer: Benjamin Britten) Premiere: San Francisco Ballet 
 White Mourning, 1989 (Composers: Franz Schubert, Gustav Mahler) Premiere: Ballet West
 Ophelia, 1988 (Composer: Bohuslav Martinu) Premiere: Ballet West
 Narcisse, 1987 (Composer: Claude Debussy) Premiere: San Francisco Ballet 
 Hamlet and Ophelia Pas de Deux, 1985 (Composer: Bohuslav Martinu) Premiere: San Francisco Ballet
 Aubade, 1985 (Composer: Francis Poulenc) Premiere: Israel Ballet
 Accidental or Abnormal Chromosomal Events, 1984 (Composer: Al Aguis-Sinerco) Premiere: Bay Area Playwrights Festival
 Tar Marmalade, 1984 (Composer: Douglas Adams) Premiere: Oakland Ballet
 Chansons de Scheherazade, 1983 (Composer: Maurice Ravel) Premiere: San Francisco Ballet
 Windows, 1983 (Composer: Ludwig van Beethoven) Premiere: San Francisco Ballet
 Loves-Lies-Bleeding, 1982 (Composer: Igor Stravinsky) Premiere: San Francisco Ballet 
 Deranged Dances, 1982 (Composer: Charles Ives) Premiere: Marin Ballet
 Six-for-Eight, 1981 (Composer: George Frederic Handel) Premiere: Palo Alto Dance Theatre
 Street Songs, 1980 (Composer: Carl Orff) Premiere: Pacific Northwest Ballet 
 Concertino, 1979 (Composer: Carlo Ricciotti) Premiere: Contemporary Dance Theatre of Tucson

Theater choreography and direction 
 A Little Night Music (Music and Lyrics: Stephen Sondheim) American Conservatory Theater (A.C.T.), San Francisco
 Arcadia (2013) American Conservatory Theater (A.C.T.), San Francisco
 Tosca Café (2011) Theatre Calgary, Vancouver Playhouse
 The Tosca Project (2010) American Conservatory Theater (A.C.T.), San Francisco 
 Tis Pity She's a Whore (2008) A.C.T., San Francisco
 A Christmas Carol, (2005) A.C.T., San Francisco
 A Doll's House, (2003) A.C.T., San Francisco

 Opera choreography 
 Two Women (2015) (Music by Marco Tutino) (Adapted on the novel La Ciociara by Alberta Moravia) San Francisco Opera
 Andrea Chenier (1995) Lyric Opera of Chicago 
 Capriccio (1990) San Francisco Opera, Metropolitan Opera, Lyric Opera of Chicago
 Manon (1986) San Francisco Opera

 Concert choreography 
 Mlada (2003) San Francisco Symphony 
 Psycho, The Ballet (1996) San Francisco Pops
 Embraceable You (1995) San Francisco Pops

 Film choreography 
 The Metropolitan Opera HD Live (TV series) (1 episode) 
 – R. Strauss: Capriccio (2011)Great Dancers of our Time In der Hauptrolle Vladimir Malakhov, Lucia Lacarra und Kiyoko Kimura (DVD – 2005)
-- Choreography for Lady of the Camellias Television 

In 2015, co-choreographed with Helgi Tomasson, a commercial for the 50th Anniversary Super Bowl with dancers from San Francisco Ballet.

Choreography from "Lambarena"  featured on Sesame Street with dancers Lorena Feijoo and Lorna Feijoo.

Caniparoli appeared on PBS in "The San Francisco Ballet in Cinderella" Dance in America (the Great Performances Series) in the role of Cinderella's father. 
In addition, he appeared in three television specials:

 The Creation of OMO (1987) in which he discussed the experimental dance company he co-founded  A Song for Dead Warriors (1984)Romeo and Juliet, Michael Smuin's ballet production, which aired on PBS in 1976

 Honors and awards 

Recipient, 10 grants for choreography, National Endowment for the Arts
Recipient, (2001) Isadora Duncan Dance Award for Choreography, Death of a Moth, San Francisco Ballet
Nominated, (1997) Lambarena nominated for the Prix Benois de la Danse for Best Choreography.
Recipient, (1997 & 1994) awards from the Choo-San Goh & H. Robert Magee Foundation 
    1997: Open Veins, Atlanta Ballet
    1994: Lambarena, San Francisco Ballet
Recipient, (1997) Isadora Duncan Award for Sustained Achievement
Recipient, (1991–1992) Choreographers Fellowship, National Endowment for the Arts
Recipient, (1991) Artist Fellowship, California Arts Council
Recipient, (1991) Artist Fellowship, California Arts Council
Recipient, (1987) Isadora Duncan Award for Aubade'', Bay Area Dance Coalition
Recipient, (1981–1988), Choreographers' Fellowship, National Endowment for the Arts
Recipient, (1972) Ford Foundation Scholarship

References

External links 

Val Caniparoli's website: http://www.valcaniparoli.com

San Francisco Ballet website: http://www.sfballet.org

American male ballet dancers
1951 births
Living people
American choreographers
San Francisco Ballet dancers
Boston Ballet
Joffrey Ballet
Royal Winnipeg Ballet
The Nutcracker